Francis Demarthon (born 8 August 1950) is a French former sprinter who competed in the 1980 Summer Olympics. Specializing in the 400 metres, his personal best was 45.89 seconds. He won the event at the 1979 Mediterranean Games and won a bronze medal at the 1978 European Athletics Championships.

References

1950 births
Living people
French male sprinters
Olympic athletes of France
Athletes (track and field) at the 1980 Summer Olympics
Athletes (track and field) at the 1979 Mediterranean Games
Mediterranean Games gold medalists for France
Mediterranean Games medalists in athletics